Tilt is a 1979 American comedy-drama film about pinball hustling, starring Charles Durning and Brooke Shields as the young titular lead. It was directed by Rudy Durand.

Plot
The film opens in Texas, where Neil Gallagher (Ken Marshall) challenges obese pinball champion Harold Remmens (Durning), appropriately nicknamed "The Whale," to a $400 match. When Neil gets caught cheating, he heads off to California, where he meets teen runaway Brenda  "Tilt" Davenport (Shields), a 14-year-old pinball wizard. Neil watches as Tilt and the owner of Mickey's Bar hustle an unaware gambler in a game of pinball, and immediately decides to team up with her. He tells her that he is a hopeful country and western star and needs to raise money to make a demo tape of his songs. After hearing Neil's musical talent, she's impressed and agrees to help by traveling with him, raising cash with her pinball skills. When the two eventually end up back in his hometown, Neil sets up a $3500 game between Tilt and the Whale. However, he doesn't realize that Tilt has caught on to his lies and manipulation, and his big plans may not go as he hoped.

Cast

References

External links
 
 
 
 

1979 films
1979 comedy-drama films
1970s English-language films
Films shot in Corpus Christi, Texas
Films scored by Lee Holdridge
American comedy-drama films
1970s American films